Where the Corpses Sink Forever is the third studio album by the Dutch symphonic black metal band Carach Angren. It was released on May 18, 2012 via Season of Mist. The concept of this album is not about a Dutch urban legend or ghost stories, like the previous two albums, but it deals with war. The album contains references to World Wars I and II, as well as the Vietnam War. The first track is a tape recording of a soldier who was ordered to shoot seven prisoners of war, and each shot can be heard. The soldier explains the strange and wicked sensations he felt as he shot each of the prisoners; they were grinning happily as he tried to kill them, and it seemed like the shots went through them, but they were actually demons who captured the soldier's soul in a time loop, making him suffer for eternity. Many of the songs in this album describe the deeds of each of the seven fiends; death, war, suffering.

Track listing
All music by Carach Angren.
Main compositions by Ardek. All lyrics by Seregor, except where noted.
All guitars written by Seregor and recorded by Patrick Damiani.

Personnel
Credits adapted from the album's liner notes.

Carach Angren
Dennis "Seregor" Droomers - guitars and vocals
Clemens "Ardek" Wijers - orchestra and keyboards, backing vocals on tracks one, seven and eight
Ivo "Namtar" Wijers - drums, percussion

Additional musicians
Patrick Damiani - bass, guitars
Nikos Mavridis - violin on tracks four and nine, backing vocals on track eight
Philip Breuer - french spoken part on "General Nightmare"

Team
Patrick Damiani - recording and mixing at Tidalwave Studio (www.tidalwave.de)
Patrick Damiani and Carach Angren - producing
24-96 Mastering - mastering
Erik Wijnands (www.negakinu.com) - artwork, all photography, textures & design

References

2012 albums
Season of Mist albums
Carach Angren albums
Concept albums